Peter Arno Krauthamer (born September 6, 1957) is an associate judge of the Superior Court of the District of Columbia.

Education and career 
Krauthamer earned his Bachelor of Arts from Brandeis University in 1979, and his Juris Doctor from Boston University School of Law in 1982.

After graduating, Krauthamer worked in the Public Defender Service for the District of Columbia as a staff attorney. In 2004, he became the deputy director for the Public Defender Service overseeing a staff of 220 people including 110 attorneys.

From 1995 to 2000, Krauthamer was an assistant professor and clinical supervising attorney at Howard University School of Law.

D.C. superior court 
President Barack Obama nominated Krauthamer on July 11, 2011, to a 15-year term as an associate judge of the Superior Court of the District of Columbia to the seat vacated by John Henry Bayly Jr. On November 8, 2011, the Senate Committee on Homeland Security and Governmental Affairs held a hearing on his nomination and on the following day, November 9, 2011, the Committee reported his nomination favorably to the senate floor. On November 18, 2011, the full Senate confirmed his nomination by voice vote. He was sworn in on April 20, 2012.

Personal life 
Krauthamer has resided in Washington, D.C. and Silver Spring, Maryland since 1970. He is married to United States District Court for the District of Columbia Judge Tanya S. Chutkan. They have two sons.

References

1957 births
Living people
21st-century American judges
Boston University School of Law alumni
Brandeis University alumni
Howard University School of Law faculty
Judges of the Superior Court of the District of Columbia
People from New York City
Public defenders